Jairo Santos de Oliveira Filho, commonly known as Jairinho or Jairo, is a Brazilian footballer who plays as a forward for Treze. He played at the top level of Brazilian football for Vasco da Gama in 2019.

Career
Born in Rio de Janeiro, Jairinho first appeared in senior football at the age of 26, playing for Campo Grande in the fourth level of the Campeonato Carioca, the Rio de Janeiro state championship. He scored 6 goals in the 7 games he played with the club. Later in 2018, he was spotted by Bangu whilst playing in a training game, and signed for the club for the start of the 2018 season. In 2019 he helped the club finish third in the Campeonato Carioca, qualifying them for national competition.

The 2019 Campeonato Carioca campaign ended for Bangu with semi-final defeat against Vasco da Gama, and a few days later Jairinho joined the Série A club. He made his top-flight debut for Vasco on 4 May 2019, as a substitute in a 1–1 draw against Corinthians, a game which took place in Arena da Amazônia.

After making four substitute appearances in the first three months of the season, Jairinho was loaned to Atlético-GO in Série B for the remainder of the 2019 season. Here he made his debut from the bench again, on 13 August 2019, in the 2–0 victory against Oeste.

At the end of 2019, Jairinho returned to Bangu to play with the club in the 2020 Campeonato Carioca and 2020 Copa do Brasil. He was released when the COVID-19 pandemic forced suspension of competition, and was a free agent until signing for Carioca third division side Artsul in October 2020. After only three games with the club, he agreed termination of his contract and signed for ABC who were active in the later stages of the 2020 Campeonato Brasileiro Série D. On 27 November 2020, in the final group game of the competition against Itabaiana, he scored his first national competition goal.

ABC ended their campaign at the first knockout stage in December, leaving Jairinho free to sign for Treze in January 2021.

References

External links
 

Living people
1990 births
Brazilian footballers
Footballers from Rio de Janeiro (city)
Association football forwards
Campo Grande Atlético Clube players
Bangu Atlético Clube players
CR Vasco da Gama players
Atlético Clube Goianiense players
Artsul Futebol Clube players
ABC Futebol Clube players
Treze Futebol Clube players
Campeonato Brasileiro Série A players
Campeonato Brasileiro Série B players
Campeonato Brasileiro Série D players